Shelly Oria (born 1978) is an Israeli-American author, notable for short stories featuring queer characters.

Personal life and achievements 
Oria was born in Los Angeles, California, but grew up in Israel. She features queer characters in her stories. She received the Indiana Review Fiction Prize, a Sozopol Fiction Seminars Fellowship in Bulgaria and was an artist in residence with the Lower Manhattan Cultural Council between 2014 and 2015.

Her collection of short stories, New York 1, Tel Aviv 0, was published by FSG and Random House Canada in November 2014. Her work has been featured in several publications, including The Paris Review and McSweeney's. Oria received attention about the book from The New York Times, Kirkus Review, and other outlets. New York 1, Tel Aviv 0 was translated into Hebrew and published in Israel by Keter Books in August 2015.

Higher Education
Oria received a Master of Fine Arts from Sarah Lawrence College in 2007. She began writing in fiction in English, her second language, at the college in 2006. Oria studied how to be a life and creativity coach while in Israel between 2008 and 2009 in the Alder Institute and with Julia Cameron in 2004.

Awards 
As of March 16, 2015, Oria was a finalist for the Lambda Literary Award and a nominee for the Edmund White Award for Debut Fiction. She is also a MacDowell Colony fellow.

Current life 
Oria lives in Brooklyn, New York. In September 2015, she told Israeli newspaper Yediot Ahronot that she's currently at work on several projects, including a play trilogy, a feature film, and a novel. She curates the Sweet! Actors Reading Writers series. It is currently on hiatus.

She works at the Pratt Institute as a fiction teacher and a co-director for the Writer's Forum. She's had her private practice as a life and creativity coach since 2009.

Works

Books

Short stories 

"Do You Follow the News?" (2011)
"Documentation" (2010)
"Emma's Undoing" (2010)
"Integrity" (2011)
"It Is Something Like This" (2010)
"My Wife in Converse" (2010)
"New York 1, Tel Aviv 0" (2010)
"Phonetic Masterpieces of Absurdity" (2010)
"Reassembly" (2010)
"Stand Still" (2014)
"That Night"
"The Beginning of a Plan"
"The Difference Between Gary Last Night and Tonight" (2012)
"The Disneyland of Albany" (2014)
"The Thing About Sophia" (2014)
"This Way I Don't Have to Be"
"Tzfirah" (2010)
"We, the Women"

References

External links 
 , official website
 Shelly Oria's Twitter
 The In-Between Space: An Interview with Shelly Oria from The Paris Review
 Wave Motion: An Interview with Shelly Oria from Fiction Writers Review
 Young (Mostly), Hip (Mostly), Adrift in 2 Worlds

1978 births
21st-century American women writers
21st-century American short story writers
American expatriates in Israel
American feminist writers
American people of Israeli descent
American women academics
American women short story writers
American lesbian writers
LGBT people from California
LGBT people from New York (state)
Life coaches
Living people
Pratt Institute faculty
Queer writers
Sarah Lawrence College alumni
Writers from Brooklyn
Writers from Los Angeles